Amaru may refer to:

Places
 Amaru, Buzău, a village in Buzău County, Romania
 Amaru, Rimatara, a village on the island of Rimatara, French Polynesia
 Amaru Marka Wasi, an archaeological site in Peru

People
Tupac Amaru Shakur, American rapper, actor and poet
Amaru, 7th century Indian poet, author of Amaru Shataka
 Aline Amaru (born 1941). Tahitian textile artist
 Túpac Amaru, the last indigenous leader of the Inca state in South America
 Túpac Amaru II, leader of an indigenous uprising in 1780 against Spanish Viceroyalty of Peru
 Bobby Amaru, the lead singer of the American rock band Saliva

Other
 Amaru (mythology), a mythical serpent of Inca and other Andean mythology 
 Amaru Entertainment, a record label founded by the mother of deceased rapper Tupac Shakur
 Amaru Ryudo, a fictional character in the Sohryuden: Legend of the Dragon Kings novels
 Amaru, a fictional character in Naruto Shippuden the Movie: Bonds

See also
Amarus, a vocal composition by Czech composer Leoš Janáček
Amaro (disambiguation)
Túpac Amaru (disambiguation)